Krishna Ram Chaudhary was an Indian musician. In 2017, he was awarded Padma Shri by the Indian Government for his contribution in music.

Early life
Chaudhary was from Benaras.

Career
Chaudhary at the age  16 topped the All India Radio (AIR) competition in shehnai and was awarded a gold medal. He was awarded the President's Award in the All India Radio music competition in 1961.In 1982, he got the Critics’ Circle of India Award.

Awards
Padma Shri in 2017
Sangeet Natak Akademi Award

Death
Chaudhary died at the age of 83 and was suffering  from gastroenterological disease.

References

Indian male classical musicians
Recipients of the Sangeet Natak Akademi Award
Shehnai players
20th-century Indian musicians
20th-century male musicians
Indian musicians